Martez Harrison (born October 1, 1993) is an American basketball player. He played college basketball for the University of Missouri–Kansas City (UMKC).  At UMKC, Harrison was the 2015 Western Athletic Conference Player of the Year and was named the school's first All-American in the history of its men's basketball program.

College career
Harrison, a 5'11 point guard, was born and raised in Kansas City, Missouri.  Following his high school career at University Academy and a prep season at Brewster Academy in Wolfeboro, New Hampshire, he held no scholarship offers from high-major schools.  He decided to attend hometown UMKC as one of head coach Kareem Richardson's first recruits. In his first season, Harrison broke school records in points per game (17.2), assists (114), steals (50), free throws (164) and free throw attempts (257) and was named the Western Athletic Conference (WAC) freshman of the year.

In his sophomore season, Harrison led the Kangaroos to a second-place WAC finish and after averaging 17.5 points and 3.9 assists per game was named first-team all-conference and the WAC Player of the Year.  A few weeks later, he was named an honorable mention All-American by the Associated Press, making him the first All-American in program history.

Dismissal
In mid-November 2016, Harrison was suspended for a domestic assault charge under Title IX. Harrison was suspended indefinitely and was dismissed from the program on December 12, 2016. The charges were later dropped.

Professional career
On September 4, 2017, Harrison signed with the Glasgow Rocks of the British Basketball League.

References

External links
Kansas City Roos bio
Martez Harrison on RealGM

1993 births
Living people
African-American basketball players
American expatriate basketball people in the United Kingdom
American men's basketball players
Basketball players from Kansas City, Missouri
Glasgow Rocks players
Kansas City Roos men's basketball players
Point guards
21st-century African-American sportspeople